Plagiostachy's crocydocalyx is a monocotyledonous plant species first described by Karl Moritz Schumann, and given its current name by Brian Laurence Burtt and Rosemary Margaret Smith. Plagiostachys crocydocalyx is part of the genus Plagiostachys and the family Zingiberaceae. No subspecies are listed in the Catalog of Life.

References 

crocydocalyx
Taxa named by Rosemary Margaret Smith